The Union of Orthodox Banner-Bearers (SPKh; ; Soyuz pravoslavnykh khorugvenostsev, SPKh) is a Russian nationalist-fundamentalist organization that identifies itself as part of the  Russian Orthodox Church, though the church has implicitly repudiated that claim. The organisation was led by Leonid Simonovich-Nikshich who co-founded the group in 1992. The Union's stated primary aim is to "resurrect the spirit" of Russian Orthodoxy, by conducting processions with banners and icons in Moscow and other regions.

The group became famous for its use and promulgation of the phrase "Orthodoxy or Death," and its association with violent skinhead reactionaries.  In 2009 the head of the Russian Orthodox Church, Patriarch Kirill, denounced this slogan and said to "beware" those who used it, calling it "dangerous, false and intrinsically contradictory":   A Moscow court later agreed in a decision denouncing the phrase as "extremist."

References

Further reading

External links
 

Far-right politics in Russia
Russian Orthodox Church in Russia
Christian organizations established in 1993
Religious organizations based in Russia
Eastern Orthodoxy and far-right politics